Benicio Monserrate Rafael del Toro Sánchez (born February 19, 1967) is a Puerto Rican actor and producer. He has garnered critical acclaim and numerous accolades, including an Academy Award, a BAFTA Award, a Golden Globe Award, two Screen Actors Guild Awards and a Silver Bear for his portrayal of the jaded but morally upright police officer Javier Rodriguez in the film Traffic (2000). Del Toro's performance as ex-con turned religious fanatic in despair Jack Jordan, in Alejandro González Iñárritu's 21 Grams (2003), earned him a second nomination for the Academy Award for Best Supporting Actor.

He is also known for his breakout role as the eccentric, unintelligible crook Fred Fenster in The Usual Suspects (1995); Benny Dalmau in Basquiat (1996), winning two consecutive Independent Spirit Awards for both films; Dr. Gonzo in Fear and Loathing in Las Vegas (1998); gambling addict Franky Four Fingers in Snatch (2000); the predatory, unhinged antagonist Jackie Boy in Sin City (2005); revolutionary Che Guevara in Che (2008), a performance that earned him the Best Actor award both at the Cannes Film Festival and at the Goya Awards; and as Alejandro, a mysterious, ruthless agent out to bring down a drug cartel in Sicario (2015), for which del Toro was nominated for several awards, including the BAFTA Award for Best Actor in a Supporting Role.

His other roles include portrayals of the Collector in the Marvel Cinematic Universe; drug lord Pablo Escobar in Escobar: Paradise Lost (2014); Lawrence Talbot in the 2010 remake of The Wolfman; and the codebreaker in Star Wars: The Last Jedi (2017). In 2018, he starred as Richard Matt in the Showtime miniseries Escape at Dannemora,  for which he received a nomination for the Primetime Emmy Award for Outstanding Lead Actor in a Limited Series or Movie.

Early life
Del Toro was born on February 19, 1967, in San Germán, Puerto Rico, to Gustavo Adolfo del Toro Bermúdez and Fausta Genoveva Sánchez Rivera (daughter of Benicio Sánchez Castaño and Lirio Belén Rivera), who were both lawyers. He has an older brother, Gustavo, who is the Executive Vice President and Chief Medical Officer at the Wyckoff Heights Medical Center in the Bushwick section of Brooklyn, New York. He had a Catalan paternal great-grandfather and a Basque maternal great-grandmother. Del Toro's great-grandfather was Rafael Rivera Esbrí, one of the heroes of the El Polvorin fire in Ponce, and who would also later become mayor of that city (1915-1917).

He spent most of his infancy in Santurce, a barrio within San Juan. Del Toro, whose childhood nicknames were "Skinny Benny" and "Beno", was raised a Roman Catholic and attended Academia del Perpetuo Socorro (The Academy of Our Lady of Perpetual Help), a Roman Catholic school in Miramar, Puerto Rico. When del Toro was nine years old, his mother died of hepatitis. At age 15, he moved with his father and brother to Mercersburg, Pennsylvania, where he was enrolled at the Mercersburg Academy. He spent his adolescence and attended high school there. After graduation, del Toro followed the advice of his father and pursued a business degree at the University of California, San Diego. Success in an elective drama course encouraged him to drop out of college and study with noted acting teachers Stella Adler and Arthur Mendoza, in Los Angeles, as well as at the Circle in the Square Theatre School in New York City.

Career
Del Toro surfaced in small television roles during the late 1980s, playing mostly thugs and drug dealers on programs such as Miami Vice and the NBC miniseries Drug Wars: The Camarena Story. He appeared in the 1987 music video for Madonna's song "La Isla Bonita" as a background character sitting on a car hood. Film roles followed, beginning with his debut in Big Top Pee-wee (1988) and as Dario in the James Bond film Licence to Kill (1989), in which 21-year-old del Toro held the distinction of being the youngest actor ever to play a main Bond henchman. Del Toro continued to appear in film including The Indian Runner (1991), China Moon (1994), Christopher Columbus: The Discovery (1992), Money for Nothing (1993), Fearless (1993) and Swimming with Sharks (1994).

His career gained momentum in 1995 with his breakout performance in The Usual Suspects, where he played the mumbling, wisecracking Fred Fenster. The role won him an Independent Spirit Award for Best Supporting Male and established him as a character actor. This led to stronger roles in independent and major studio films, including playing Gaspare in Abel Ferrara's The Funeral (1996) and winning a second consecutive Independent Spirit Award for Best Supporting Male for his work as Benny Dalmau in Basquiat (1996), directed by his friend, film-maker and painter Julian Schnabel. Del Toro also shared the screen with Robert De Niro in the big-budget thriller The Fan (1996), in which he played Juan Primo, a charismatic Puerto Rican baseball star. He subsequently starred opposite Alicia Silverstone in Excess Baggage (1997), which Silverstone produced.

For Fear and Loathing in Las Vegas, the 1998 film adaptation of Hunter S. Thompson's famous book, he gained more than 40 lbs. (about 18 kg) to play Dr. Gonzo (a.k.a. Oscar Zeta Acosta), Thompson's lawyer and drug-fiend cohort. The surrealistic film, directed by Terry Gilliam, has earned a cult following over the years.

Del Toro's performances in four films in 2000 gained him a mainstream audience. First, the crime yarn The Way of the Gun reunited him with The Usual Suspects screenwriter Christopher McQuarrie. A few months later, he stood out among a first-rate ensemble cast in Steven Soderbergh's Traffic, a complex dissection of the North American drug wars. As Javier Rodriguez — a Mexican border policeman struggling to remain honest amid the corruption and deception of illegal drug trafficking — del Toro, who spoke most of his lines in Spanish, gave a performance that dominated the film. His performance swept all of the major critics' awards in 2001. Del Toro won the Academy Award for Best Supporting Actor, becoming the fourth living Oscar winner whose winning role was a character who speaks predominantly in a non-English language. Del Toro is also the third Puerto Rican actor to win an Oscar, after Jose Ferrer and Rita Moreno. The year he won his Oscar marked the first time that two actors born in Puerto Rico were nominated in the same category (the other actor was Joaquin Phoenix). In his acceptance speech, del Toro thanked the people of both Nogales, Arizona and Nogales, Sonora and dedicated his award to them. In addition to the Oscar, he also won the Golden Globe Award and the Screen Actors Guild award for Best Actor. Traffic was also a success at the box office. This was soon followed by a small role as the diamond thief Franky Four Fingers in Guy Ritchie's hip caper comedy Snatch and a role as a mentally challenged Native American man in The Pledge, directed by his old friend Sean Penn.

In 2003, del Toro appeared in two films: The Hunted, co-starring Tommy Lee Jones and the drama 21 Grams, co-starring Sean Penn and Naomi Watts. He went on to earn another Best Supporting Actor Oscar nomination for his performance in the latter. He then appeared in the film adaptation of Frank Miller's graphic novel Sin City, directed by Robert Rodriguez, and Things We Lost in the Fire, the English-language debut of celebrated Danish director Susanne Bier.

In 2008, del Toro was awarded the Prix d'interpretation masculine (or Best Actor Award) at the Cannes Film Festival for his portrayal of Che Guevara in the biographical films The Argentine and Guerrilla (together known as Che). During his acceptance speech, del Toro dedicated his award "to the man himself, Che Guevara" along with director Steven Soderbergh. Del Toro was also awarded the 2009 Goya Award as the Best Actor for his portrayal of Guevara. Sean Penn, who won the 2009 Best Actor Oscar for his performance in Milk, remarked that he was surprised and disappointed that Che and del Toro were not also up for any Academy Award nominations. During his acceptance speech for the Best Actor award at the Screen Actors Guild Awards, Penn expressed his dismay stating, "The fact that there aren't crowns on Soderbergh's and del Toro's heads right now, I don't understand... that is such a sensational movie, Che." For the final portions of the film (shown here), del Toro shed 35 pounds to show how ill Guevara had become near the end of his life in the jungles of Bolivia.

In 2010, del Toro starred in and produced the remake of Lon Chaney Jr.'s classic cult film The Wolf Man (1941). He was chosen to be the face of the 2011 Campari calendar, becoming the first male model to be featured in the Italian liquor company's calendar. Del Toro played The Collector in a mid-credits scene of Marvel Studios' superhero film Thor: The Dark World (2013) and later reprised his role in Guardians of the Galaxy (2014) and Avengers: Infinity War (2018).

In September 2015, del Toro played Alejandro Gillick in the critically acclaimed Sicario, about a principled FBI agent who is enlisted by a government task force to bring down the leader of a powerful and brutal Mexican drug cartel. Film critics widely praised his performance. Del Toro reprised his role in the sequel Sicario: Day of the Soldado (2018). In 2016, del Toro appeared in a Heineken television advertisement in its More Behind the Star series. The gag in the spot is that fans frequently mistake him for fellow actor Antonio Banderas, much to del Toro's chagrin. In 2017, he played DJ (an abbreviation for "Don't Join", as DJ viewed the Resistance and the First Order as equally corrupt), a supporting antagonist in Star Wars: The Last Jedi, who betrayed Rose and Finn to save himself when they were apprehended on the First Order's flagship. 

In 2021, del Toro starred in the Wes Anderson film The French Dispatch as Moses Rosenthaler, a mentally disturbed artist.

Personal life
On April 11, 2011, del Toro's publicist announced that del Toro and Kimberly Stewart, daughter of British singer Rod Stewart were expecting a child, although they were not in a relationship. Stewart gave birth to a daughter on August 21, 2011. They had their daughter baptized in Puerto Rico.

On November 4, 2011, he acquired Spanish citizenship, along with fellow Puerto Rican Ricky Martin. The request was granted by the Spanish government in recognition of his artistic talents and for his Spanish ancestry (he has family in Barcelona).

In March 2012, he was granted an honorary degree by the Interamerican University of Puerto Rico for his influence on the cinema enterprise, during the celebration of the institution's centenary.

Environmental causes

In 2003, Benicio del Toro became the spokesman of the educational campaign "Yo Limpio a Puerto Rico", an environmental organization founded in 1997 by Ignacio Barsottelli, whose mission is to educate and mobilize Puerto Ricans in favor of recycling and the protection of the environment.

Del Toro narrated the public service announcement entitled "Coral Reef", joining the "Artists to the rescue of the environment" campaign.

Filmography

Film

Television

Theme park attractions

Awards and nominations

See also

 Academy Award for Best Supporting Actor
 List of Puerto Ricans
 Cultural diversity in Puerto Rico

Notes

References

External links

 
 
 

1967 births
Living people
Best Actor Goya Award winners
Best Supporting Actor Academy Award winners
Best Supporting Actor BAFTA Award winners
Best Supporting Actor Golden Globe (film) winners
Cannes Film Festival Award for Best Actor winners
Circle in the Square Theatre School alumni
Hispanic and Latino American male actors
Independent Spirit Award for Best Supporting Male winners
Mercersburg Academy alumni
Naturalised citizens of Spain
Outstanding Performance by a Cast in a Motion Picture Screen Actors Guild Award winners
Outstanding Performance by a Male Actor in a Leading Role Screen Actors Guild Award winners
People from Mercersburg, Pennsylvania
People from San Germán, Puerto Rico
Puerto Rican Roman Catholics
Puerto Rican male film actors
Puerto Rican male television actors
Puerto Rican people of Basque descent
Puerto Rican people of Catalan descent
Puerto Rican people of Italian descent
Puerto Rican people of Spanish descent
Silver Bear for Best Actor winners
Stella Adler Studio of Acting alumni
University of California, San Diego alumni
20th-century American male actors
21st-century American male actors
20th-century Puerto Rican male actors
21st-century Puerto Rican male actors